Powelliphanta hochstetteri anatokiensis, known as one of the amber snails, is a subspecies of large, carnivorous land snail, a terrestrial pulmonate gastropod mollusc in the family Rhytididae. It is found in New Zealand.

Conservation status
Powelliphanta hochstetteri anatokiensis is classified by the New Zealand Department of Conservation as being in Gradual Decline.

Distribution
 New Zealand

Life cycle
Shape of the eggs is oval and seldom constant in dimensions 9.5 × 7, 8.5 × 6, 12 × 10.5, 12 × 10, 12.5 × 10.5 mm.

References

 New Zealand Department of Conservation Threatened Species Classification

Powelliphanta
Gastropods of New Zealand
Taxa named by Arthur William Baden Powell
Endemic fauna of New Zealand
Endemic molluscs of New Zealand